7th New York Film Critics Circle Awards
January ?, 1942(announced December 31, 1941)

Citizen Kane

The 7th New York Film Critics Circle Awards, announced on 31 December 1941, honored the best filmmaking of 1941.

Winners
Best Picture:
Citizen Kane
Best Actor:
Gary Cooper - Sergeant York
Best Actress:
Joan Fontaine - Suspicion
Best Director:
John Ford - How Green Was My Valley

References

External links
1941 Awards

New York Film Critics Circle Awards
New York Film Critics Circle Awards
New York Film Critics Circle Awards
New York Film Critics Circle Awards